Samson Peak is a  mountain summit located on the eastern shore of Maligne Lake in Jasper National Park, in the Canadian Rockies of Alberta, Canada. The nearest higher peak is Mount Charlton,  to the east. Samson Peak is situated 1.72 km south of Leah Peak in the Queen Elizabeth Ranges.

History

Samson Peak was named by Mary Schäffer in her expedition through the area in 1908 to find Maligne Lake. She also named nearby Leah Peak for Leah Beaver, the wife of Samson Beaver. Samson was a Stoney Indian who befriended Mary and provided her with a hand drawn map to assist her with finding the way to the elusive lake. Samson visited the lake with his father at the age of 14, and 16 years later he drew the map from memory when he met Mary at Elliott Barnes' cabin on the Kootenay Plains in the Saskatchewan Valley.

The first ascent of Samson Peak was made in 1928 by W.R. Hainsworth and M.M. Strumia The mountain's name was officially adopted in 1947 by the Geographical Names Board of Canada.

Climate

Based on the Köppen climate classification, Samson Peak is located in a subarctic climate zone with cold, snowy winters, and mild summers. Winter temperatures can drop below −20 °C with wind chill factors below −30 °C. Precipitation runoff from Samson Peak drains west into Maligne Lake, thence into the Maligne River which is a tributary of the Athabasca River.

See also
List of mountains of Canada
Geography of Alberta

References

External links
 Weather forecast: Samson Peak
 Parks Canada web site: Jasper National Park

Samson Peak
Samson Peak
Alberta's Rockies
Canadian Rockies